Bear Creek is a stream in Henry and Johnson counties of west central Missouri. It is a tributary of Big Creek.

Bear Creek was so named on account of bears in the area.

See also
List of rivers of Missouri

References

Rivers of Henry County, Missouri
Rivers of Johnson County, Missouri
Rivers of Missouri